Locke-Ober (–2012) was the fourth-oldest restaurant in Boston, Massachusetts, after the Union Oyster House (1826), Durgin-Park (1827), and the Jacob Wirth Restaurant (1868). Locke-Ober featured French cuisine and seafood.

History
The Greek Revival building was constructed in 1832. By 1862, the Boston City Directory listed Adrien Destre as operating a restaurant at 2 Winter Place. By 1868, F.A. Blanc was listed as running the restaurant. By 1879, Boston city records listed Luis Ober as the proprietor of a restaurant at 2 Winter Place of "over twenty years' standing".  From the start, the restaurant specialized in French food and was central to the financial, political, and intellectual history of Boston.

Louis Ober was born in 1837 in the French department of Alsace. At age fourteen Ober moved to New York, working as a barber, book seller and importing and exporting goods between the United States and France. Ober lived and worked in New Jersey, Cincinnati, and Philadelphia, before settling in Boston. Ober was employed at the restaurant then owned and operated by Blanc. While in Blanc's employ, Ober became familiar with French food, fine wine and furnishings. By 1875, Ober had acquired ownership and applied to the city for expansion of the restaurant to 3-4 Winter Place. Financing was provided by Eben Jordan, a co-founder of the Jordan Marsh Company. The restaurant reopened as Ober's Restaurant Parisien.

Over the next 20 years the restaurant was expanded and became furnished with increasingly luxurious imported materials typical of the Gilded Age, including Honduran mahogany, French furniture, Italian and French sculpture and paintings, English silver and Bohemian crystal lighting. Until 1970 the restaurant was open to males only.

By the late twentieth century, Locke-Ober - though still possessing most of its original grand trappings - had lost much of its popularity. Boston restaurateur Lydia Shire, with investor Paul Licari, leased the space in 2001 and began a painstaking restoration of the main and private dining rooms on the third floor, adding two more contemporary rooms.  Jacky Robert was executive chef until 2003.  Nonetheless, the restaurant closed in 2012, with reports that the owners planned to sell the building.

The building was added to the National Register of Historic Places in 1986. The location is now occupied by Yvonne's.

The restaurant was the setting of the opening scene in Robert B. Parker's 1980 Spenser novel Looking for Rachel Wallace. It was also the setting of the denouement of Death in a Tenured Position (also published as A Death in the Faculty) by Amanda Cross published in 1981. The detective, Kate Fansler, is taken there by the lawyer, John Cunningham, at which she presents to him her solution to the mystery. Cunningham claims Fansler only likes the restaurant because it used not to admit women; she denies this, saying she is attracted by the creamed spinach and the waiters who tended to be 'deaf and placating'. It was also the restaurant that Professor Lambeau took Robin Williams' character, Sean, to in an attempt to convince him to work with the main protagonist in Good Will Hunting. The fictional character I.M. Fletcher has lunch at Locke-Ober with newspaper editor Jack Saunders in the 1976 novel Confess, Fletch by Gregory McDonald.

See also 
 List of French restaurants
 National Register of Historic Places listings in northern Boston, Massachusetts

References

 Forbes, Esther, and Arthur Griffin. The Boston Book. Houghton Mifflin Company: 1947. 
 Morrisey, Louise Lane, and Marion Lane Sweeney. An Odd Volume of Cookery. Houghton Mifflin Company: 1949.

External links

Defunct restaurants in Boston
Restaurants on the National Register of Historic Places in Massachusetts
Financial District, Boston
Restaurants established in 1875
1875 establishments in Massachusetts
2012 disestablishments in Massachusetts
National Register of Historic Places in Boston
Restaurants on the National Register of Historic Places
Defunct French restaurants in the United States
French restaurants in Massachusetts